Brainiac (also stylized as 3RA1N1AC), is an American indie rock band from Dayton, Ohio. It was formed in January 1992 by Tim Taylor, Juan Monasterio (Monostereo), Michelle Bodine and Tyler Trent. They disbanded after the sudden death of lead singer Tim Taylor in a car accident on May 23, 1997.

History
Brainiac was formed in Dayton, Ohio, United States in January 1992 with vocalist, guitarist and keyboard player (particularly Moog synthesizers) Tim Taylor (July 20, 1968 – May 23, 1997), bassist Monostereo (Juan Monasterio), guitarist Michelle Bodine and drummer Tyler Trent.  On March 12, the band played its first show at Wright State's University Cafeteria, under the name We'll Eat Anything.

After a slew of singles, they released their debut album, Smack Bunny Baby, on Grass/BMG Records in 1993. Shortly after the album's release, Gary Gersh offered Brainiac a $2 million record deal with Geffen Records; allegedly, the band's response was to tell him to "fuck off." The band's next album, Bonsai Superstar (1994), featured John Schmersal on guitar in place of Bodine. In 1995 they played on the Lollapalooza side stage and recorded four songs in the UK for the BBC Radio 1 Peel Sessions. They joined Touch and Go Records and released Internationale, produced by Kim Deal (of The Breeders). The following year, their third album, Hissing Prigs in Static Couture, was released on the Touch & Go label. All three of their albums were produced by Eli Janney (of Girls Against Boys).

Brainiac generated buzz as a live act to see that resulted in opening slots on tours for Beck, the Breeders and the Jesus Lizard, and received offers from major labels. In 1997, they released an electronic-based EP called Electro-Shock for President which turned out to be their last record. On May 23, 1997, while driving back home, Taylor was overcome by leaking carbon monoxide fumes and crashed his vintage Mercedes car into a lamppost, dying instantly. The group, who were in the middle of pre-production for their fourth album (which was due out on Interscope Records), soon disbanded. A benefit show featuring The Breeders and Guided By Voices took place a few months later.

After recording a solo album under the name John Stuart Mill, guitarist John Schmersal later went on to form Enon. Monasterio directs music videos, including two for Enon, and released in 2008 an EP with a new band called Model/Actress with Curtis Mead and Charlie Walker from Chamberlain and ex-Bullet LaVolta drummer Philips; Schmersal makes appearances on this album. Trent briefly joined the Breeders and most recently played with The Dirty Walk.  Bodine became the guitarist and singer of O-matic and Shesus.

In early 2019, a documentary entitled Transmissions After Zero was released by director Eric Mahoney to favorable reviews. This included several live performances at various locations, with friend Tim Krug including New York, Los Angeles and their hometown of Dayton, Ohio.  The film was released on DVD and streaming on February 21, 2020.

The surviving members of Brainiac also appeared on an episode of Conan Neutron's Protonic Reversal to discuss the career of the band, the death of Tim Taylor and the documentary.

In 2022, the band was announced as UK tour support for Mogwai for February 2023. These dates were followed by a headlining tour in the UK, again in February 2023. In January the band released The Predator Nominate EP featuring never-before-heard demos.

Influence and legacy
Chris Walla of Death Cab for Cutie claimed Brainiac influenced his work on Narrow Stairs.

Matt Bellamy of Muse claims that a certain section in the song "Exo-Politics" from Black Holes and Revelations was heavily influenced by Brainiac.

Cedric Bixler and Omar Rodríguez-López of The Mars Volta state Brainiac, specifically Electro-Shock for President as an influential record. On their influence Cedric states:

During a BBC radio session, Nine Inch Nails' frontman Trent Reznor commented on Brainiac that they were a major influence on him, "from a sonic standpoint." He also revealed that while recording 2005's With Teeth he would use Electro-Shock for President as a "sound reference."

Members
Current members
 John Schmersal – guitar, keyboards, backing vocals (1994–1997), lead vocals (2022–2023)
 Juan "Monostereo" Monasterio – bass (1992–1997, 2022–2023)
 Tyler Trent – drums (1992–1997, 2022–2023)
 Tim Krug – guitar, keyboards, backing vocals (2022–2023)

Past members
 Tim Taylor – vocals, guitar, keyboards (1992–1997; died 1997)
 Michelle Bodine – guitar, backing vocals (1992–1994)

Timeline

Discography

Studio albums
 Smack Bunny Baby (1993)
 Bonsai Superstar (1994)
 Hissing Prigs in Static Couture (1996)

References

External links

Musical groups from Dayton, Ohio
Indie rock musical groups from Ohio
Wright State University
Musical groups established in 1992
Musical groups disestablished in 1997
Touch and Go Records artists